Heinzen may refer to:

People
Aaron Heinzen (born 1979), American soccer player.
Karl Heinzen (1809-1880), German-American author.
Raymond F. Heinzen, American politician.